Khoronk (also Romanized as Khoronq; formerly, Lenugi, Nizhniy Aylanlu, Nerkin Aylanlu, and Lenughi) is a town in the Armavir province of Armenia. The town's church dates to 1880.

See also 
Armavir Province

References 

World Gazeteer: Armenia – World-Gazetteer.com

Populated places in Armavir Province